Unguturu is a village in Palnadu district of the Indian state of Andhra Pradesh. It is located in Amaravathi mandal of Guntur revenue division. The village forms a part of Andhra Pradesh Capital Region, under the jurisdiction of APCRDA.

Geography 

Demographics 

 Census of India, the village had a population of 2,768 . The total population constitute, 1369 males and 1399  females with a sex ratio of 1022 females per 1000 males. 278 children are in the age group of 0–6 years, with a ratio of 904 per 1000. The average literacy rate stands at 63.09% significantly lower than the state average of 67.41%.

Government and politics 

Unguturu Gram Panchayat is the local self-government of the village. There are wards, each represented by an elected ward member. The present sarpanch is vacant, elected by the ward members. The village is administered by the  Amaravathi Mandal Parishad at the intermediate level of panchayat raj institutions.

Education 

As per the school information report for the academic year 2018–19, the village has a total of 2 MPP schools.

References 

Villages in Palnadu district